Gastroboletus is a genus of fungi in the family Boletaceae. Species in the genus have misshapen caps, poorly developed or absent stipes, and are often buried or partially buried. Gastroboletus has tubes arranged irregularly, rather than vertically as in typical boletes. The edibility of most species is unknown, and those known to be edible are not highly rated.

Species

References

External links

Boletaceae
Boletales genera